The UK National Association for Environmental Education (NAEE) is one of the earliest environmental education non-profit organizations in the United Kingdom formed in 1960 as the National Rural Studies Association, and since 1971 operating under its current name.

Its mission is promoting environmental education in all forms, as well as supporting educators in their work, to make the future of our planet more sustainable. It provides resources and training of teachers and non-formal educators interested in teaching sustainability in their classes and developing a sustainability-oriented curriculum, in particular focusing on early education, and with a particular emphasis on local context education. It is the only association in the UK that is run by teachers for their peers.

It is registered as a charity organization and publishes a triannual practitioner journal, Environmental Education. Since 2017 NAEE is running a fellowship program in recognition of individuals, who make a contribution to environmental education. It is also offering bursaries to carry out outdoors environmental education.

Its current President is Justin Dillon, Professor of Science and Environmental Education at the University of Exeter. The board of trustees is chaired by William Scott, and Nina Hatch is Executive Director.

References

Environmental education in the United Kingdom
Non-profit organisations based in the United Kingdom
Environmental education
Environmental organisations based in the United Kingdom
1950 establishments in the United Kingdom